Luo Guo-long  (born 24 June 1989) is a Taiwanese baseball outfielder for the Uni-President Lions of the Chinese Professional Baseball League (CPBL). He is the younger brother of Kuo-Hui Kao.

He represented Taiwan at the 2011 and 2013 World Port Tournaments and the 2017 World Baseball Classic.

Luo began his career with the Uni-President 7-Eleven Lions in 2014 and has played for the club through the 2020 season.

References

External links 
WBC Media Guide

1989 births
Living people
Baseball outfielders
Taiwanese baseball players
Uni-President Lions players
Uni-President 7-Eleven Lions players
People from Hualien County
2017 World Baseball Classic players